Jens Lukas (born April 13, 1966) is a German long-distance runner.

Achievements
 Won the Spartathlon 246 km - race from Athens to Sparta, Greece three  times (1999), (2004), (2005) and finished second two times (2000), (2001)
 Won the International Sri Chinmoy 24h Run at Basel/Switzerland two times (1999), (2008)
 Won the International Association of Ultrarunners (IAU) 24h European Championship at  Gravigny (2002) with 267 km 294 metres
 Finished third in the International Association of Ultrarunners (IAU) 24h World Championship at Wörschach (2005) with 256 km 368 metres
 Won the 153 km  West Highland Way Race  (2008) from Milngavie north of Glasgow to Fort William in the Scottish Highlands
 Finished  second  (2007) in the Ultra-Trail du Mont-Blanc and fourth  (2006)

References
 German Ultra Runners Association Statistics. http://statistik.d-u-v.org/getresultperson.php?runner=1553
 Spartathlon Hall of Fame. https://web.archive.org/web/20110721083341/http://www.spartathlon.gr/statisticssub.php?i=12&p=113

External links
 Personal Webpage Jens Lukas

1966 births
Living people
German male long-distance runners
German ultramarathon runners
Male ultramarathon runners
20th-century German people
21st-century German people